Renu Devi (born 1 November 1958) is an Indian politician who served as the 5th Deputy Chief Minister of Bihar from 16 November 2020 to 9 August 2022.

She became the fifth female Deputy Chief Minister of India from Bihar in 2020. A former national Vice-President of the Bharatiya Janata Party, she is currently a Member of the Bihar Legislative Assembly and the deputy legislative leader of party for the National Democratic Alliance.



Personal life 
Renu, eldest of her parents' three sons and five daughters, comes from the Noniya caste, an extremely backward Class (EBC) community. She completed secondary school education in 1977 from the Babasaheb Bhimrao Ambedkar Bihar University.

She was married to a Kolkata-based insurance inspector named Durga Prasad in 1973. However, the sudden death of her husband within seven years of marriage made her return to Bettiah, her mother's hometown, and pursue it as her karmabhoomi. She is a single parent with two children.

Political career 

Renu Devi's mother was associated with the Sangh Parivar, which is said to have strongly influenced her. Renu Devi was also part of Durga Vahini, the women's wing of the Vishwa Hindu Parishad.

Beginning her political career through social activism in 1981, she later joined the BJP Mahila Morcha or BJP women's wing in 1988.  Next year, she was given the responsibility to head the wing in the Champaran region. She was further chosen as the wing's state head for two terms, in 1993 and 1996.

Though she unsuccessfully contested her first election in 1995 from the Nautan Assembly seat, she  was successful in being elected four times from Bettiah (2000-2015;2020–present), another division of West Champaran district, to the Bihar Legislative Assembly. She lost 2015 elections to a Mahagathbandhan candidate from whom she recovered the seat again in 2020.

She served as the Minister of Sports, Arts and Culture in the Bihar State Government between 2005 and 2009. She was also a national vice-president of the BJP between 2014 and 2020, and was nominated as a member of the National Working Committee of the party by Amit Shah. Her appointment in 2020 as a Deputy Chief Minister of Bihar has been positively received.

References 

Bharatiya Janata Party politicians from Bihar
Living people
State cabinet ministers of Bihar
People from West Champaran district
People from Bettiah
Women members of the Bihar Legislative Assembly
Bihar MLAs 2000–2005
Bihar MLAs 2005–2010
Bihar MLAs 2010–2015
Bihar MLAs 2020–2025
Deputy Chief Ministers of Bihar
1958 births
20th-century Indian women
20th-century Indian people
Women deputy chief ministers of Indian states
21st-century Indian women politicians